The 2017–18 Israeli Women's Cup (Gvia HaMedina Nashim) was the 20th season of Israel's women's nationwide football cup competition. The competition began on 19 December 2017 with 6 first round matches.
 
F.C. Ramat HaSharon won the cup, beating F.C. Kiryat Gat 3–2 in the final.

Results

Bracket

1The match was abandoned at the 59th minute with Hapoel Bnei Fureidis leading 20–0 as Maccabi Be'er Sheva remained with only six players on the field. 
2Maccabi Bnot Emek Hefer failed to appear to the match.

Final

References

External links
2017–18 State Cup Women Israeli Football Association  

 
 
 

 
Israel Women's Cup seasons
women's cup
Israel